The men's ISSF 50 meter pistol was a shooting sports event held as part of the Shooting at the 1956 Summer Olympics programme. It was the ninth appearance of the event. The competition was held on 30 November 1956 at the shooting ranges in Melbourne. 33 shooters from 22 nations competed. Nations had been limited to two shooters each since the 1952 Games. The winner was Pentti Linnosvuo of Finland, the nation's first medal in the free pistol. The Soviet Union also won its first medal in the event, with Makhmud Umarov's silver. American Offutt Pinion took bronze.

Background

This was the ninth appearance of the ISSF 50 meter pistol event. The event was held at every Summer Olympics from 1896 to 1920 (except 1904, when no shooting events were held) and from 1936 to 2016; it was nominally open to women from 1968 to 1980, although very few women participated these years. 1896 and 1908 were the only Games in which the distance was not 50 metres; the former used 30 metres and the latter 50 yards.

Two of the top 10 shooters from the 1952 Games returned: gold medalist (and 1948 fourth-place finisher) Huelet Benner of the United States and sixth-place finisher (and 1936 gold and 1948 bronze medalist) Torsten Ullman of Sweden. Benner and Ullman had finished first and second, respectively, at the 1954 world championships.

Australia, Canada, Colombia, Japan, Malaya, Pakistan, and South Korea each made their debut in the event. The United States made its eighth appearance, most of any nation, having missed only the 1900 event.

Linnosvuo used a Hämmerli 100.

Competition format

The competition had each shooter fire 60 shots, in 6 series of 10 shots each, at a distance of 50 metres. The target was round, 50 centimetres in diameter, with 10 scoring rings. Scoring for each shot was up to 10 points, in increments of 1 point. The maximum score possible was 600 points. Any pistol was permitted. Shoot-offs were held to break ties for top ranks.

Records

Prior to this competition, the existing world and Olympic records were as follows.

No new world or Olympic records were set during the competition.

Schedule

Results

Linnosvuo won the shoot-off for gold against Umarov, 26–24. The shoot-off for fourth place went to Hosaka over Yasynskiy, 24–20.

References

Shooting at the 1956 Summer Olympics
Men's 1956